Hodejov is a village and municipality in the Rimavská Sobota District of the Banská Bystrica Region of southern Slovakia.

History
In historical records, the village was first mentioned in 1280 (Gede),when the local feudatories the Ratoldoy built a castle in the zone. It successively it belonged to families Ilsvay, Palóczy, Országy and Kubiny. In the 16th century the castle was devastated by Turks. In the 18th century the village was ruled by Kubinyi family again. From 1938 to 1944, it was annexed by Hungary.

Genealogical resources

The records for genealogical research are available at the state archive "Statny Archiv in Banska Bystrica, Slovakia"

 Roman Catholic church records (births/marriages/deaths): 1762-1897 (parish A)

See also
 List of municipalities and towns in Slovakia

External links
https://web.archive.org/web/20080111223415/http://www.statistics.sk/mosmis/eng/run.html
http://www.hodejov.ou.sk/
http://www.hodejov.gemer.org/
http://www.e-obce.sk/obec/hodejov/hodejov.html
Surnames of living people in Hodejov

Villages and municipalities in Rimavská Sobota District